The Palestine national under-17 football team, represents Palestine in association football at an under-17 age level and is controlled by the Palestinian Football Association, the governing body for football in Palestine. The team has yet to qualify for either the FIFA U-17 World Cup or the AFC U-17 Asian Cup.

Competition history

FIFA U-17 World Cup Championship record

AFC U-17 Asian Cup record

Arab Cup U-17

WAFF U-16 Championship

Results and fixtures

2022

See also
 Palestine national football team
 Palestine national under-23 football team
 Palestine national under-20 football team
 Palestine women's national football team
 Football in Palestine

References

U
Asian national under-17 association football teams